Budi Bowoleksono is the Indonesian Ambassador to the United States. He was appointed in February, 2014 by President Joko Widodo.

References 

Indonesian diplomats
Ambassadors of Indonesia to the United States
Living people
Year of birth missing (living people)